Xenorhina bidens is a species of frog in the family Microhylidae. It is endemic to New Guinea and found between Lorentz River in the west and Fly River in the east, thus being present in both West Papua (Indonesia) and Papua New Guinea. Common name Digul River fanged frog has been coined for it, in reference to Digul River where the type series was collected in 1904 or 1905.

Description
Adult females grow to at least  in snout–vent length. The body is stout. The head is moderately narrow but broader than it is long. The snout is pointed and projecting, with slightly warty point; skin is smooth elsewhere. The eyes are small. The tympanum is visible. The fingers have no discs but the toes are slightly dilated terminally and could be interpreted as having small discs. Colouration is brown above, with some patterning: a few darker markings on the back and legs, and some mottling in the upper lip. A light vertebral stripe may also be present. The ventral surfaces are mottled with dark and light brown.

Habitat and conservation
The diet includes ants.

Threats to this species are unknown. It is also unknown whether it is present in any protected areas.

References

bidens
Endemic fauna of New Guinea
Amphibians of Papua New Guinea
Amphibians of Western New Guinea
Amphibians described in 1909
Taxa named by Pieter Nicolaas van Kampen
Taxonomy articles created by Polbot